In mathematics, a split-biquaternion is a hypercomplex number of the form

where w, x, y, and z are split-complex numbers and i, j, and k multiply as in the quaternion group.  Since each coefficient w, x, y, z spans two real dimensions, the split-biquaternion is an element of an eight-dimensional vector space. Considering that it carries a multiplication, this vector space is an algebra over the real field, or an algebra over a ring where the split-complex numbers form the ring. This algebra was introduced by William Kingdon Clifford in an 1873 article for the London Mathematical Society. It has been repeatedly noted in mathematical literature since then, variously as a deviation in terminology, an illustration of the tensor product of algebras, and as an illustration of the direct sum of algebras.

Modern definition
A split-biquaternion is ring isomorphic to the Clifford algebra Cℓ0,3(R).  This is the geometric algebra generated by three orthogonal imaginary unit basis directions,  under the combination rule

giving an algebra spanned by the 8 basis elements  with (e1e2)2 = (e2e3)2 = (e3e1)2 = −1 and ω2 = (e1e2e3)2 = +1.
The sub-algebra spanned by the 4 elements  is the division ring of Hamilton's quaternions, .
One can therefore see that

where  is the algebra spanned by  the algebra of the split-complex numbers.
Equivalently,

Split-biquaternion group
The split-biquaternions form an associative ring as is clear from considering multiplications in its basis {1, ω, i, j, k, ωi, ωj, ωk}. When ω is adjoined to the quaternion group one obtains a 16 element group 
( {1, i, j, k, −1, −i, −j, −k, ω, ωi, ωj, ωk, −ω, −ωi, −ωj, −ωk}, × ).

Module
Since elements {1, i, j, k} of the quaternion group can be taken as a basis of the space of split-biquaternions, it may be compared to a vector space. But split-complex numbers form a ring, not a field, so vector space is not appropriate. Rather the space of split-biquaternions forms a free module. This standard term of ring theory expresses a similarity to a vector space, and this structure by Clifford in 1873 is an instance.  Split-biquaternions form an algebra over a ring, but not a group ring.

Direct sum of two quaternion rings
The direct sum of the division ring of quaternions with itself is denoted .

Proposition: The algebra of split-biquaternions is isomorphic to 

proof: Every split-biquaternion has an expression q = w + z ω  where w and z  are quaternions and ω2 = +1. Now if p = u + v ω is another split-biquaternion, their product is 

In , the product of these images, according to the algebra-product of  indicated above, is

This element is also the image of pq under the mapping into 
Thus the products agree, the mapping is a homomorphism; and since it is bijective, it is an isomorphism.

Though split-biquaternions form an eight-dimensional space like Hamilton's biquaternions, on the basis of the Proposition it is apparent that this algebra splits into the direct sum of two copies of the real quaternions.

Hamilton biquaternion 
The split-biquaternions should not be confused with the (ordinary) biquaternions previously introduced by William Rowan Hamilton.  Hamilton's biquaternions are elements of the algebra

Synonyms
The following terms and compounds refer to the split-biquaternion algebra:
 elliptic biquaternions – , 
 Clifford biquaternion – , 
 dyquaternions – 
  where D = split-complex numbers – , 
 , the direct sum of two quaternion algebras –

See also
 Split-octonions

References

 Clifford, W.K. (1873) Preliminary Sketch of Biquaternions, pages 195–7 in Mathematical Papers via Internet Archive 
 Clifford, W.K. (1882) The Classification of Geometric Algebras, page 401 in Mathematical Papers, R. Tucker editor
 
 
 
 
 
 

Clifford algebras
Historical treatment of quaternions

de:Biquaternion#Clifford Biquaternion